David Bayssari (born 15 June 1970) is a Lebanese former professional rugby league footballer who played first-grade for the Balmain Tigers.

Playing career
Bayssari, played for the Wentworthville Magpies as a junior. In 1988, he won the Australian Schoolboys Grand Final, in that game he also won Player of the Match. 

In 1991, he played his first game of first grade for Balmain which came against Canterbury-Bankstown in round 1 of the 1991 season at Leichhardt Oval. 

In his 93 game career, Bayssari played a number of positions for Balmain. 
Bayssari's time at the club was a difficult period in Balmain's history as they missed the finals each season and finished last in 1994 which was only the fourth time a Balmain side had come last in the competition.

Bayssari also played during the period in which Balmain changed their name to the "Sydney Tigers" at the start of the Super League war and moved their home games to Parramatta Stadium.  Bayssari's final game in the top grade came in round 7 of the 1997 ARL season against North Sydney which ended in a 9-7 victory for Balmain at Leichhardt Oval.

Coaching career
In 1998, the year after his retirement, he went on to coach the reserve grade teams and was the assistant for the NRL team for Balmain and later on the Wests Tigers once the club had merged.
He also coached the Sydney Bulls, from 2005 until 2009 in the Ron Massey Cup, making the Grand Final 4 seasons in a row and winning the premiership in 2006.
From 2011 to 2013 Bayssari was the head coach of the Lebanese national side.

References

External links
 David Bayssari stats

1970 births
Living people
Balmain Tigers players
Lebanese rugby league coaches
Lebanese rugby league players
Lebanon national rugby league team coaches
Rugby league centres
Rugby league five-eighths
Rugby league halfbacks
Wentworthville Magpies players